The Maléku Jaíka language, also called Malecu, Maleku, Guatuso, Watuso-Wétar, and Guetar, is an Indigenous American language in Costa Rica.

Classification
The Maléku Jaíka language is a member of the Votic branch of the Chibchan language family. 
Maléku, or 'the speech of our people', is considered to be endangered according to The Endangered Languages Project. According to the 2011 National Population Census, 67.5% of the population that lives in the official Maléku territory declared that they speak the language; however, the state of vitality varies from one village to another and even among families (Sánchez 2011). In any case, following the parameters of UNESCO, the language can be classified as definitively endangered (Sánchez 2013).

History
The Maleku people (usually called "Guatusos" in historical documents, travel chronicles of the 19th and 20th centuries, and in multiple academic studies) constitute one of the original peoples of the Costa Rican territory. While their contact with the Hispanic language and culture was extremely sporadic and limited at least until the second mid-nineteenth century (Constenla, 1988; Castillo, 2004), it can be assumed that this contact was intensified in the middle of the twentieth century.

Geographic distribution

Official status
Maléku is an indigenous language of north-central Costa Rica, in the area of Guatuso, in the province of Alajuela, Costa Rica. It is spoken by around 300 to 460 indigenous Maléku people in an area of 2994 hectares. The aboriginal group that speaks Maléku is also known as the Guatusos. They live in three communities called Palenques in the northern area of Costa Rica: Margarita, Tonjibe and El Sol. According to Constenla (1998), the Guatuso is in a state of decline in Margarita (the largest village) and in a state of resistance in Tonjibe and El Sol. At the 2000 census, 71.1% of the members of the ethnic group declared themselves to speak the language, but only 49% considered it as the mother tongue.  The 2011 National Census of Population reported that 67.5% of the population in these communities speaks this language (Avendaño 2018). The Ministry of Education (MEP, Minienciclopedia de los Territorios Indígenas de Costa Rica 2017) reported a Maléku population of 498 inhabitants. According to this institution, children attending schools in the region of Guatuso receive bilingual instruction in Maléku and Spanish.  According to Espinoza Romero, Mejía Marín & Ovares Barquero 2011, the school, traditionally an acculturation mechanism, has not contributed to strengthening the MaléKu identity. For instance, students receive instruction of core subjects in Spanish. They have to learn how to read and write in Spanish first. When they already read and write in the mainstream language, they can learn their language. The authors claim that the norm has been the teaching of the official language: Spanish and that despite the existence of educational policies that contemplate the revitalization of the use of indigenous languages in the region, there is an absence of strategies for teaching aboriginal languages.

Dialects/Varieties

The speakers of these three communities have declared that there are differences between the variety spoken by the communities of Margarita and El Sol and the one that is spoken by the people of Tonjibe (Avendaño 2018). Corobicí is possibly a dialect.

Phonology

Vowels

Maleku has five vowels.

Vowel notes

Sánchez (1984) affirms that the vowel system of the Maleku is similar to Spanish (apart from length contrast); he cites some words with unlike VV sequences but is unclear if these are single nuclei or V.V.

Smith Sharp (1979) argues for V.V with an optional desyllabification of high vowels to approximants [w, j], in agreement with Costenla Umaña (1983).

Stress

Sánchez (1984) argues that stress is contrastive.  The examples given suggest there may be role for morphological structure and vowel length in predicting stress placement. Smith Sharp (1979: 42) states "En maleku, hay una sola oposición de acento. Cada palabra tiene por los menos un acento primario que no es predecible en palabras de dos o más sílabas."

Consonants

The traditional consonant system of the Maleku includes fifteen phonemes:

Consonant notes

Sánchez (1984) reports /t/ as 'dental-alveolar' and other coronals as 'alveolar'.  Contrast between /ɬ, x/ appears to be in process of being lost in favor of /x/ (Costenla Umaña 1983). Influence from Spanish has added voiced stops and /ɲ/ to the modern colloquial language; these are not included in the inventories of Sánchez (1984), Smith Sharp (1983) or in the text counts of Krohn (2017). Costenla Umaña (1983) excludes them from his 'heritage inventory'.

Syllabic notes

(C)V(ː)(C) seems to be the basic pattern, with no clusters, as suggested by Smith Sharp (1983: 44).  Any C can occur in onset (except rhotics word-initially); any C except affricates, fricatives and /ɾ/ in coda.  Sánchez (1984) gives 2 examples of word-internal CC codas /rɸ, rp/ in /irp-tʃia, irɸ-laŋ/ "drink it, eat it" and suggests CVCC as max syllable, but such examples are described as the result of an optional loss of a vowel in the 2nd person ergative prefix /riɸa/ by Costenla Umaña (1983: 18)

Canonical Form:
(C)V(ː)(C)
	
Syllabic Restriction:
(C)V(ː)(C)

Grammar

Word order 
The basic order of the elements is variable in transitive and in intransitive clauses. In intransitive clauses the common order is SV, but it is also possible to find VS order.

Subjects and objects 
Maleku possesses an ergative–absolutive actancial system.

Subject of an intransitive verb 
In intransitive clauses the subject is expressed in absolutive case. The affixes that  appear in the verb establish a concordance of the person with the subject. These are:

Subject of a transitive verb 
In transitive clauses Maleku distinguishes between complete  and incomplete  transitive clauses. The affixes that  appear in the verb are common in both constructions. These are

Number 
Maleku distinguishes between singular and plural in common nouns. The plural is expressed in two ways.

Personal pronouns 
There are four personal pronouns in Maleku. These are:

Writing system 
The alphabet of Maleku was proposed by the linguist Adolfo Constenla, and it was adopted as official by the Asesoría de Educación Indígena del Ministerio de Educación Publica de Costa Rica.

Vowels

Consonants

Vocabulary 
kapi kapi = hello (with a knocking gesture on your partner's shoulder)
afekapian = Thank you
w-ay = yes
hebet = no
fufu = morfo butterfly
niskak = bird
pili = toucan
pek-pen = frog
gnou-ek = red-eye frog
ti-fakara = waterfall
irri miotem? = what is your name?
 = my name is ...
 = I would like a cup of coffee
errekeki kerakou = let's go (to a place)
erreke malehila =let's go swimming

Numbers
Dooka = One
Pángi = Two
Poóse = Three
Pakái= Four
Otíni= Five

Common Nouns
Ochápaká= Man
Kuríjurí= Woman
Toji= Sun
Tlijii= Moon
Laká= Earth
Oktara= Stone
Koora= Tree
Uu= House

References

Further reading
Barrantes, R., Smouse, P. E., Mohrenweiser, H. W., Gershowitz, H., Azofeifa, J., Arias, T. D., & Neel, J. V. (1990). Microevolution in lower Central America: genetic characterization of the Chibcha-speaking groups of Costa Rica and Panama, and a consensus taxonomy based on genetic and linguistic affinity. American Journal of Human Genetics, 46(1), 63–84.
Brinton, Daniel G. 1891. The American Race: A Linguistic Classification and Ethnographic Description of the Native Tribes of North and South America. New York: N. D. C. Hodges Publisher
Guatuso. Retrieved from http://multitree.org/codes/gut.html
Madrigal Cordero, P., & Solís Rivera, V. (2012). Recognition and Support of ICCAs in Costa Rica. Kothari et al.
Maleku Indian Language (Guatuso, Jaika). (2016). Retrieved from http://www.native-languages.org/maleku.htm
Herrera Miranda, Roberto E. 2017. Valency classes in Maleku. (MA thesis, Universität Leipzig; 178pp.)
Herrera Miranda, Roberto. Endangered Languages Documentation Programme (sponsor). n.d. Endangered Languages Archive.
Pache, Matthias. Morphosyntactic Properties of Chibchan Verbal Person Marking. Retrieved from http://journals.dartmouth.edu/cgibin/WebObjects/Journals.woa/1/xmlpage/1/article/462?htmlAlways=yes
Ryan, James. Maleku Jaika. N.p., 1 Mar. 2013. Web. 1 May 2016. <http://dice.missouri.edu/docs/chibchan/MalekuJaika.pdf>.
Campbell, L., & Grondona, V. (Eds.). (2012). The indigenous languages of South America: A comprehensive guide (Vol. 2). Walter de Gruyter.
Ramos Rivas, K. (2014). Situación actual del programa de enseñanza de lenguas indígenas del  Ministerio de Educación Pública. Revista Electrónica Educare, 18(3), 203–219. doi:  http://dx.doi.org/10.15359/ree.18-3.12

External links
https://www.youtube.com/watch?v=o6RHVMC0YNA 
https://www.youtube.com/watch?v=oNLxEcmgFGg  
https://www.youtube.com/watch?v=_QKhqaxYiG0
https://www.youtube.com/watch?v=3tJvxJzhsHM
https://www.culturalsurvival.org/news/life-health-purity-and-survival-maleku-costa-rica-struggle-regain-lost-lands
Link to ELAR Maleku Dictionary Project
https://www.dipalicori.ucr.ac.cr/lengua-cultura/malecu/

Bibliography

Languages of Costa Rica
Chibchan languages
Endangered Chibchan languages